Pekaracing NV, competing as PK Carsport, is a racing team that currently competes in the NASCAR Whelen Euro Series as well as the Belcar Trophy in conjunction with Russell Racing. The team has previously competed in other series such as the FIA GT Championship.

History
PK Carsport has a long history in Belgian autosport.  In 1968 PEKA Racing was founded by racing driver Paul Kumpen. Besides racing Kumpen was an entrepreneur and partial owner of Ridley Bikes. The team initially started in rallycross. In 1989, 1990 and 1991 Kumpen participated in the Dutch and Belgian rounds of the FIA European Rallycross Championship. Racing at the Duivelsbergcircuit, Glossocircuit and Mandescircuit and the Dutch Eurocircuit. He scored his best result in 1990 at the Eurocircuit finishing in ninth place in Division 2.

After rallycross the team entered the Formula Opel Euroseries with Jean-François Hemroulle and Oscar Middeldorp in 1992. In 1994 and 1995 the team with Middeldorp switched to the Formula Renault running Alpa chassis. Middeldorp ended up eighth in the final standings in 1994 in the Eurocup. David Saelens joined the team in 1995. In 1995, Paul Kumpen, Albert Vanierschot and Georges Cremer won the 24 Hours of Zolder in a Porsche 993.

In 1997 PEKA Racing merged with GL Racing, a racing team formed in 1992 by Ghislain Lenaers, to form GLPK Racing. In 1998 it entered the short-lived GTR Euroseries, winning the Misano Gold Cup. Kumpen shared the Porsche 911 GT2 with Stéphane Cohen and Charles Margueron. The team scored another podium finish at the Nürburgring.

Belcar
In 1998 Kurt Thiers and Vincent Vosse competed in the Belgian Belcar championship. The duo scored three podium finished and secured the third place in the championship standings in their Porsche 911. The following year the team entered a Porsche 993 Turbo for Anthony Kumpen and Stephane Cohen. The team dominated, winning three times at Zolder and once at Spa. The team secured the championship 120 points clear of the number two, Cor Euser and Herman Buurman. For 2000 the team combined their FIA GT and Belcar championships using the Chrysler Viper GTS-R in both series. Despite winning six out of eight races, including the 24 Hours of Zolder the championship was decided in the last round at Zolder in October. Kumpen and Cohen retired early in the race and as Albert Vanierschot and Bert Longin won the race and the championship over GLPK Racing. The 2001 Bert Longin and former motocross racer Eric Geboers won two races in the Belcar championship. Longin was the best placed GLPK Racing driver in twelfth place in the championship. The following season PK Carsport dominated Belgium's premier racing series. Four PK Carsport drivers placed in the top four of the championship. Bert Longin scored most points, followed by David Hart, Anthony Kumpen and Vincent Dupont. All races were won by one or the other GLPK Chrysler Vipers. In 2003 all but one races were won by GLPK Racing, one race was won by Paul Belmondo Racing. Of the GLPK Racing drivers, Anthony Kumpen was declared series champion. After a partial season in 2005, GLPK Racing won the championship again in 2006. Kumpen and Longin won five races and finished third in the 24 Hours of Zolder. Therefore, the team, now racing a Corvette, won the championship. For 2007 the Belcar championship was reorganized and SRO Belgium took over. Kumpen scored two wins and again clinched the championship. As the original Belcar championship ceased to exist PK Carsport backed out of the championship.

FIA GT Championship

In 2004 GLPK Racing joined forces with Carsport Holland, the team run by Mike Hezemans, changing its name to PK Carsport. The team entered the prestigious FIA GT Championship in 2005. Bert Longin, Anthony Kumpen, Mike Hezemans won two races, the 2005 FIA GT Zhuhai Supercar 500 and 2005 FIA GT Imola Supercar 500. The Chevrolet Corvette C5-R team ended up fourth in the season standings. The following year the same drivers finished fifth in the season standings winning at the 2006 FIA GT Paul Ricard 500km. In 2007 Ghislain Lenaers resigned from GLPK Racing, leaving the team PK Racing, later renamed to PK Carsport. In 2007 the union between Carsport Holland and PK Carsport ended. PK Carsport continued in the FIA GT Championship. At the 2007 Spa 24 Hours the team signed Kurt Mollekens and Frédéric Bouvy besides their regular drivers Kumpen and Longin. The team failed to win a race the whole season finishing fifth in the standings, behind Carsport Holland. For 2008 PK Carsport switched cars. The team attracted the Saleen S7-R to race. The team's performance was variable. The team initially struggled to score points but won the season finale at the Potrero de los Funes Circuit. Hezemans returned in 2009 to race in the final 'old' style FIA GT championship. The team also returned to the Chevrolet Corvette, upgrading to the C6.R type. The team won the races at Oschersleben and the 24 Hours of Spa. However, the season came to a dramatic end at Zolder (the team's home track). Battling for the championship the Vitaphone Racing team won the race at Zolder. However, PK Carsport filed an appeal as they claimed the Vitaphone team breached the pitstop regulations. However, after an investigation, the PK Carsport team was disqualified for a technical infringement. Both Vitaphone Racing and PK Carsport were invited to enter the 2010 24 Hours of Le Mans. PK Carsport was on the initial entry list but later withdrew.

Pagani Zonda GR

Paul Kumpen, along with Tom Weickardt, owner of American Viperacing and Toine Hezemans, owner of Carsport Holland, was requested by Pagani to develop a racing version of Pagani Zonda C12 S. Kumpen, Weickardt and Hezemans founded a new company, Carsport Zonda, to develop the new car. One Pagani Zonda GR was completed a few months after development started at the Modena headquarters of Carsport Zonda. While the car used the original carbon fiber chassis, front and rear diffusers were added to the bodywork. The engine was also updated leading to better performance.

Under the Carsport America entry, the car was entered in the 2003 24 Hours of Le Mans. Mike Hezemans, Anthony Kumpen and David Hart were selected as its drivers. During the initial tests, the car placed the 36th time, eleventh in the GTS class. The Pagani qualified 32nd, ninth in class. However, the race for the car was only ten laps long. After ten laps the Xtrax gearbox failed after which the car retired.

After Le Mans, the car was intended to enter the final round of the Belcar championship by GLPK Racing. Due to a missing vital component to the engine, the car never raced in the championship. The car was sold to Czech gentleman racer Antonin Herbeck. In 2012 the car suffered a vicious crash at Autodrom Most. Jan Vonka, in an Audi A4 DTM, attempted a pass for the lead in the race on Herbeck. The two cars touched and the Zonda GR hit a concrete wall and was nearly destroyed in the crash. The car was later repaired and raced again in the DMV Gran Turismo Touring Car Cup among other series.

Racing for Holland

One year after the Pagani Zonda GR disappointment the PK Carsport team returned to Le Mans in 2004. The Belgian team ran the Racing for Holland Dome S101. Tom Coronel, Justin Wilson and Ralph Firman were the drivers for the LMP1 entry. The car qualified tenth for the most famous 24 hour race. The team had to retire with an ignition problem to their Judd GV4 4.0L V10 engine.

Superleague Formula

Belgian football club, R.S.C. Anderlecht, was active in the Superleague Formula between 2008 and 2010. During the three seasons the team was run subsequently by Team Astromega in 2008, Zakspeed in 2009, and Azerti Motorsport in 2010. Azerti Motorsport, led by Wim Coekelbergs, was supported by PK Carsport entering the Panoz DP09 for racing driver Davide Rigon. PK Carsport provided Azerti Motorsport with car maintenance and technical support. Management and engineering are in the hands of Azerti Motorsport. The cooperation proved very successful. Rigon won races at Assen, Zolder and Adria. Rigon won his second Superleague Formula championship in 2010. After a troubled 2011 season, in which only two rounds were run, the Superleague Formula folded.

Return to Belgian racing
After the Belgian GT Championship folded the series was revamped as the Belgian Racing Car Championship. In the endurance championship PK Carsport entered an Audi R8 LMS for Anthony Kumpen, Bert Longin and Maarten Makelberge. The team won the first round at Zolder and in total scored podium finishes in five out of six races. The team won the championship in 2013.

NASCAR Whelen Euro Series

In early 2014 PK Carsport announced it would enter the NASCAR Whelen Euro Series. Bert Longin and Anthony Kumpen entered the Elite 1 division. Maxime Dumarey raced the Elite 2 division full-time while the other car featured various drivers. At the first race in Valencia Longin scored the pole position. Longin and Kumpen finished second and third in the race while Yann Zimmer won. Kumpen was a constant top ten finisher. He eventually won one race, at the Le Mans Bugatti Circuit. Kumpen won the championship by one point at the final round over multiple series champion Ander Vilariño. In the Elite 2 division, Dumarey was very successful. Despite winning only one race, he won the championship. The team struggled the following season. Kumpen crashed twice, at Raceway Venray (first race) and Tours Speedway. The Belgian driver also won the second race at Raceway Venray. Kumpen placed fourth in the series championship. In Elite 2 Stienes Longin, son of Elite 1 driver Bert, had a strong debut season. Longin was a regular top-five finisher and also a winner at Tours. He placed fourth in the season standings.

Motorsports results

Complete FIA GT Championship results
(key) (Races in bold indicate pole position) (Races in italics indicate fastest lap)

Complete NASCAR Whelen Euro Series - Elite 1 results
(key) (Bold – Pole position awarded by qualifying time. Italics – Pole position earned by points standings or practice time. * – Most laps led.)

Complete NASCAR Whelen Euro Series - Elite 2 results
(key) (Bold – Pole position awarded by qualifying time. Italics – Pole position earned by points standings or practice time. * – Most laps led.)

Gallery

References

External links

Belgian auto racing teams
FIA GT Championship teams
FIA GT1 World Championship teams
NASCAR teams
Superleague Formula teams
24 Hours of Le Mans teams
Auto racing teams established in 2004